Silver Edition is a limited edition 10-disc CD box set released by Klaus Schulze in 1993 containing new studio material in addition to unreleased archival recordings. This set was wholly included in Schulze's 50-disc CD box set The Ultimate Edition released in 2000. Beginning in 2009, tracks from this set were reissued as La Vie Electronique, a series of 3-disc CD sets releasing all the material of The Ultimate Edition in chronological order.

Track listing

Disc 1: Film Musik (Disc 1 of The Ultimate Edition)

Disc 2: Narren des Schicksals (Disc 2 of The Ultimate Edition)

Disc 3: Was War Vor der Zeit (Disc 3 of The Ultimate Edition)

Disc 4: Sense of Beauty (Disc 4 of The Ultimate Edition)

Disc 5: Picasso Geht Spazieren (Disc 5 of The Ultimate Edition)

Disc 6: Picasso Geht Spazieren (Continued) (Disc 6 of The Ultimate Edition)

Disc 7: The Music Box (Disc 7 of The Ultimate Edition)

Disc 8: Machine de Plaisir (Disc 8 of The Ultimate Edition)

Disc 9: Life in Ecstasy (Disc 9 of The Ultimate Edition)

Disc 10: Mysterious Tapes (Disc 10 of The Ultimate Edition)

See also
Historic Edition
Jubilee Edition
Contemporary Works I
Contemporary Works II

References

External links
 Silver Edition at the official site of Klaus Schulze
 

Klaus Schulze albums